Nikolai Vasilievich Bugaev (September 14, 1837 – June 11, 1903) was a prominent Russian mathematician, the father of Andrei Bely.

Early life and education
Bugaev was born in Georgia, Russian Empire into a somewhat unstable family (his father was an army doctor), and at the age of ten young Nikolai was sent to Moscow to find his own means of obtaining an education. He graduated in 1859 from Moscow University, where he majored in mathematics and physics.

Bugaev then studied engineering and then wrote a master's thesis in 1863 on the convergence of infinite series.  This document was considered sufficiently impressive to win him a place studying under Karl Weierstrass and Ernst Kummer in Berlin. He also spent some time in Paris studying under Joseph Liouville. He earned his doctoral degree in 1866.

Career
After his doctoral degree, Bugaev returned to Moscow and taught there for the remainder of his career. Some of his most influential papers offered proofs of previously unproven assertions of Liouville, but his most original work centered around the development of formal analogies between arithmetic and analytic operations.

Bugaev was an active member and president (1891-1903) of the Moscow Mathematical Society. He also wrote influential philosophical essays in which he trumpeted the virtues of mathematical analysis and decried the influence of geometry and probability.  Many feel he is largely responsible for the pronounced predilection towards "hard analysis" which is characteristic of so much of the best Russian mathematics. Through Bugaev's star student, Dmitri Egorov, many famous Russian mathematicians, such as Andrei Kolmogorov and Nikolai Luzin, directly "descend" from Bugaev—and thus from the Prince of Mathematicians, Carl Friedrich Gauss.

Personal life
Bugaev was a talented chess player.

Bugaev was a memorable "character" whose life was touched by scandal.  He was not, it is said, much admired for his looks, but his wife was considered brilliant, beautiful, and rich, and the Bugaevs were socially prominent. Their mathematically, musically, and artistically talented son, Boris Nikolaevich Bugaev (14 October 1880 O.S.-8 January 1934), went on to adopt the pseudonym Andrei Bely, under which name he helped found the Symbolist movement. Professor Korobkin, the main character of Bely's innovative novel Moscow, was inspired by Nikolai Bugaev. In view of his father's prejudices, Boris Bugaev was fascinated by probability and particularly by the notion of entropy, which is mentioned in several of his novels and poems.

References

Bibliography

External links
Bugaev's chess games

Corresponding members of the Saint Petersburg Academy of Sciences
Russian mathematicians
19th-century mathematicians from the Russian Empire
20th-century Russian mathematicians
Russian philosophers
1837 births
1903 deaths
Professorships at the Imperial Moscow University
Imperial Moscow University alumni